Henri Jean (born 1954) served as Prefect of Saint Pierre and Miquelon from March 2016 to January 2018. He replaced Jean-Christophe Bouvier and was replaced by Thierry Devimeux.

References

Living people
1954 births
Date of birth missing (living people)
Place of birth missing (living people)